Don Lisbon (born January 15, 1941) is a former running back in the National Football League, and an all-star in the Canadian Football League.

After playing college football at Bowling Green State University Lisbon was drafted by the NFL's San Francisco 49ers. He played two seasons with them, including 20 games, 561 rushing yards, 34 pass receptions, 3 touchdowns, and 1 completed pass for a TD.

He also played 3 seasons in the CFL. His first, 1966 with the Montreal Alouettes, was a success, rushing for 1007 yards and being named an all-star. He was traded to the Edmonton Eskimos in 1967, and finished his career with them in 1968.

Notes

1941 births
Living people
African-American players of Canadian football
American football running backs
Canadian football running backs
Bowling Green Falcons football players
Edmonton Elks players
Montreal Alouettes players
Players of American football from Youngstown, Ohio
San Francisco 49ers players
21st-century African-American people
20th-century African-American sportspeople